Shi Liang (March 27, 1900 – September 6, 1985) was a prominent lawyer and activist of the Republic of China. She was the only woman arrested in what was known as the Seven Gentlemen Incident on the eve of war with Japan in 1936. In 1949, she became the first Minister of Justice of the People's Republic of China.

Biography
Shi Liang was born in Changzhou, Jiangsu in 1900. She was educated in Shanghai and became a lawyer there. She and another six intellectuals were arrested by Chiang Kai-shek’s government in 1936, in what is known as the Seven Gentlemen Incident.

Shi was the first Minister of Justice of the People's Republic of China from 1949 to 1959.

Citations

General references

External links 
 Biography of Shi Liang 
 Profile of Shi Liang 

1900 births
1985 deaths
20th-century Chinese women politicians
All-China Women's Federation people
Chairpersons of the China Democratic League
Members of the China Democratic League
Ministers of Justice of the People's Republic of China
People's Republic of China politicians from Jiangsu
Politicians from Changzhou
Vice Chairpersons of the National Committee of the Chinese People's Political Consultative Conference
Vice Chairpersons of the National People's Congress
Women government ministers of China